Christopher or Chris Lawrence may refer to: 

Chris Lawrence (racing driver) (1933–2011), British racing driver
Chris Lawrence (rugby league) (born 1988), Australian professional rugby league player 
Chris Lawrence (visual effects) (active since 2002)
Christopher Lawrence (broadcaster) (born 1957), Australian classical music broadcaster
Christopher Lawrence (DJ) (active since 1997), American disc jockey and music producer
Christopher Lawrence (windsurfer) (born 1968), Australian windsurfer

See also
Chris Laurence (born 1949), English jazz double bassist 
Mark Christopher Lawrence (born 1964), American character actor
Bong Go (Christopher Lawrence Go, born1974), Filipino politician